Matthaean priority is the proposition that the Gospel of Matthew was the first gospel written of the three synoptic gospels.  It may refer to:
 Augustinian hypothesis, that the Gospel of Matthew was written first, Mark was based on Matthew, and Luke was based on both Matthew and Mark
 Two-gospel hypothesis, that the Gospel of Matthew was written first, Luke was based on Matthew, and Mark was based on both Matthew and Luke

See also
 Synoptic problem